Liurana medogensis, commonly known as Medog papilla-tongued frog or Medog eastern frog, is a species of frog in the family Ceratobatrachidae. It is found in Mêdog County, Tibet (China) and in Arunachal Pradesh, northeastern India. However, the records from India might represent another species, and the IUCN SSC Amphibian Specialist Group (2020) does not include them in the range of this species.

Description
This species is only known from four adult specimens. Males (the type series from the Mêdog County) measure  in snout–vent length and females (from Arunachal Pradesh)  in SVL. One of the females had three large eggs visible through its skin; this suggests that the species has direct development (i.e, there is no free-living larval stage) and does not depend on water bodies for reproduction. Other observations suggest instead larval development in water.

Habitat
Liurana medogensis has been found in both undisturbed and disturbed forest habitats.

References

medogensis
Frogs of China
Frogs of India
Fauna of Tibet
Amphibians described in 1997
Taxonomy articles created by Polbot